Kettle is an unincorporated community in Cumberland County, Kentucky, United States.  It lies along Route 61 south of the city of Burkesville, the county seat of Cumberland County.  Its elevation is 984 feet (300 m).

The community was named after a creek of the same name.

References

Unincorporated communities in Cumberland County, Kentucky
Unincorporated communities in Kentucky